Woodland Avenue station is a SEPTA Route 101) trolley stop in Springfield Township, Delaware County, Pennsylvania. It is officially located on Woodland Avenue (PA 420) and Rolling Road, though Rolling Road is actually a block north of the tracks. A school and athletic field exists at the end of that intersection.

Trolleys arriving at this station travel between 69th Street Terminal in Upper Darby, Pennsylvania and Orange Street in Media, Pennsylvania. The station has a shed with a roof on the south side of the tracks where people can go inside when it is raining. Like the Providence Road stop in Media, a storage track begins northeast of Woodland Avenue across from the station shed that eventually becomes the second track. Part of the reason for the single track is because the Crum Creek Bridge in Smedley Park only carries one track.

Station layout

External links

October 20, 1981 Doug Grotjahn Photo (World-NYC Subways.com)
 Station from Woodland Avenue from Google Maps Street View

SEPTA Media–Sharon Hill Line stations